Vito Santarsiero (born 2 March 1955 in Potenza) is an Italian politician.

Former member of the Christian Democracy, he joined the Italian People's Party in 1994 and then The Daisy in 2002. He has been a member of the Democratic Party since 2007.

He was elected President of the Province of Potenza at the 1999 elections and served as Mayor of Potenza for two terms from 2004 to 2014. Santarsiero also served as President of the  Regional Council of Basilicata from April 2018 to April 2019.

See also
1999 Italian local elections
2004 Italian local elections
2009 Italian local elections
List of mayors of Potenza

References

External links

 

1955 births
Living people
Mayors of Potenza
Presidents of the Province of Potenza
Christian Democracy (Italy) politicians
Italian People's Party (1994) politicians
Democracy is Freedom – The Daisy politicians
Democratic Party (Italy) politicians